The Model 45A was a .30 caliber bullpup battle rifle/light machine gun developed by the United States Army in the Philippines in 1945. The weapon existed in prototype or mockup form, but never entered production. The rifle was sparsely documented until annotated photographs of the rifle were found in the archives of the United States Army Signal Corps.

Design
The Model 45A utilized the magazine from the M1918 Browning Automatic Rifle. Rather than iron sights, it featured an integral scope. Its purpose is unclear, but it is alternately described as a "experimental .30 caliber light machine gun (LMG)" or a "field expedient .30 cal."

See also
Sieg automatic rifle
SLEM-1
EM-2 rifle
List of bullpup firearms
List of battle rifles

References

Tom Laemlein. The Incredible U.S. Model 45A.  Small Arms Review, January 2010.
Model 45A

.30-06 Springfield battle rifles
.30-06 Springfield machine guns
Bullpup rifles
Light machine guns
Trial and research firearms of the United States
Weapons of the Philippine Army